Christopher Shields (born 26 July 1958) is an American philosopher and George N. Shuster Professor of Philosophy at the University of Notre Dame.
He is the editor of Notre Dame Philosophical Reviews.

Books
Aristotle's De Anima, Translated with Introduction and Commentary, Oxford University Press 2016
Ancient Philosophy: A Contemporary Introduction, Routledge 2011
Aristotle, Routledge 2007
Classical Philosophy: A Contemporary Introduction, Routledge 2003
The Philosophy of Thomas Aquinas, with Robert Pasnau, Westview Press 2003
Blackwell Guide to Ancient Philosophy, ed., Blackwell Publishers 2002
Order in Multiplicity: Homonymy in the Philosophy of Aristotle, Oxford University Press 1999; paperback edition 2001

References

20th-century American philosophers
Philosophy academics
1958 births
Living people
21st-century American philosophers
American scholars of ancient Greek philosophy
Bowling Green State University alumni
Cornell University alumni
Commentators on Aristotle